Strugglers FC was an association football club which was founded in İstanbul by Greek immigrants in 1908.

Honours
Istanbul Football League:
Runners-Up: 1909–1910

See also
List of Turkish Sports Clubs by Foundation Dates

References
 Tuncay, Bülent (2002). Galatasaray Tarihi. Yapı Kredi Yayınları 
 Dağlaroğlu, Rüştü. Fenerbahçe Spor Kulübü Tarihi 1907–1957

Defunct football clubs in Turkey
Sports clubs established in 1908
Association football clubs established in 1908
Association football clubs disestablished in 1913
Sports clubs disestablished in 1913
Sport in Istanbul
1908 establishments in the Ottoman Empire
1913 disestablishments in the Ottoman Empire
Greek sports clubs outside Greece
Diaspora sports clubs